Onitsha North is a Local Government Area in Anambra State, south-east Nigeria. Onitsha is the only town in Onitsha North and Onitsha South LGA.

Climate
Onitsha North LGA has an average temperature of 26 °C. The dry and rainy season are the Two major seasons in the LGA .The area are usually characterized by heavy and frequent rainfall. The  River Niger flows through the Local government.

Schools
Here is the list of secondary schools in Onitsha North Local Government Area:
 Dennis Memorial Grammar School, Onitsha
Learning Field International School, Omagba
 
 Anglican Girls’ Secondary School, Onitsha
 Queen Of The Rosary College, Onitsha
 Ado Girls’ Secondary School, Onitsha
 St. Charles College, Onitsha
 St. Charles Special Science School, Onitsha
 Eastern Academy, Onitsha
 New Era Girls’ Secondary School, Onitsha
 Inland Girls’ Secondary School, Onitsha
 Washington Memorial Secondary School, Onitsha
 Patterson Memorial Secondary School, Onitsha
 Prince Memorial Secondary School, Onitsha
 Army Day Secondary School, Onitsha
 Comprehensive Secondary School, Onitsha (recently renamed Patterson secondary school) built-in former DMGS extension 
 Metropolitan College, Onitsha (Formally Metropolitan Secondary School)
 Government Technical College, Onitsha
 Onitsha High School
 Our Lady's High School, Onitsha
 Federal Government Girls’ College, Onitsha
 Akunne Oniah Memorial Secondary School, Onitsha
 All Hallows Seminary, Onitsha
 Command Children School, Onitsha
 Don Bosco Secondary School, Onitsha
 Regina Pacis Model Secondary School, Onitsha
 Springfield Acade
° Asaf Schools, Onitsha

Modebe Memorial Secondary School

Notable people
Lynda Chuba-Ikpeazu

References

LOCAL GOVERNMENT AREAS IN ANAMBRA STATE dated July 21, 2007; accessed October 4, 2007

Local Government Areas in Anambra State
Local Government Areas in Igboland